There are 29 currencies currently used in the 50 countries of Europe, all of which are members of the United Nations, except Vatican City, which is an observer with the United Nations General Assembly. All de facto present currencies in Europe, and an incomplete list of the preceding currency, are listed here.

A currency is a medium of exchange, such as money, banknotes, and coins. In Europe, the most commonly used currency is the euro (used by 25 countries); any country entering the European Union (EU) is expected to join the eurozone when they meet the five convergence criteria. Denmark is the only EU member state which has been granted an exemption from using the euro. Czechia, Hungary, Poland, Romania and Sweden have not adopted the Euro either, although unlike Denmark, they have not formally opted out; instead, they fail to meet the ERM II (Exchange Rate Mechanism) which results in the non-use of the Euro. For countries which hope to join the eurozone, there are five guidelines that need to be followed, grouped in the Maastricht criteria.

The United Kingdom's currency, sterling, is rated fourth on Investopedia's list of the top 8 most tradable currencies, and that it is a "little bit more volatile than the euro". It was ranked just ahead of the Swiss franc, ranked fifth, which is used in Switzerland and Liechtenstein, saying that the set up of the Swiss banking "emphasizes the economic and financial stability policies dictated by the governing board of the SNB". Both are in the top 8 major currencies on Bloomberg. Several countries use currencies which translate as "crown": the Czech koruna, the Norwegian krone, the Danish krone, the Icelandic króna, and the Swedish krona.

At present, the euro is legal tender in 20 out of 27 European Union member states, in addition to 5 countries not part of the EU (Monaco, San Marino, Vatican City, Andorra and Montenegro). Kosovo also uses the euro, but is only partially recognised as an independent state.

European currencies

Currencies of partially recognized states in Europe

See also 

Central banks and currencies of Europe
Currencies of the European Union
List of currencies
List of circulating currencies
Capital Markets Union
Banking Union

References

External links 
International Organization for Standardization (ISO)

Europe
 
Currencies